Sacramento City College (SCC) is a public community college in Sacramento, California. SCC is part of the Los Rios Community College District and had an enrollment of 25,307 in 2009. It is accredited by the Accrediting Commission for Community and Junior Colleges (ACCJC), offering Associate in Science (A.S) and Associate in Art (A.A.) degrees.

History
Founded in 1916 as a department of Sacramento High School, Sacramento City College is the seventh oldest public community college in California and the oldest institution of higher learning in Sacramento.

Rare for its time, Sacramento City College was founded by a woman (Belle Cooledge) and with an all female class as its first graduates, the college began with the spirit of inclusion at its very heart. First known as Sacramento Junior College, Cooledge founded the college to provide a safe, welcoming place for students to learn the basics for a college education, and to be a gathering spot for extra-curricular activities that would bring the community together.

In 1922, the citizens of Sacramento organized a junior college district, effectively granting Sacramento Junior College its administrative independence from Sacramento High School. This plan of organization remained in force until 1936, when the college became a part of the Sacramento City Unified School District.

Twenty-eight years later, as a result of a March 17, 1964, election, Sacramento City College separated from the Sacramento City Unified School District to join the newly organized Los Rios Junior College District, which took over the operation of American River College and Sacramento City College. Los Rios paid the total of $1.00 for the  Sacramento City College Campus. In October 1967, the Sacramento Pop Festival was held at the main campus' Charles C. Hughes Stadium. In 1970, the newly renamed Los Rios Community College District opened a third campus, Cosumnes River College. Folsom Lake College has recently been added to the district.

The Sacramento City College yearbook was called the Pioneer when initially published in the 1920s. The format changed in the early 1970s, and it was discontinued by 1980. The school newspaper-originally named "the Blotter" in the 1920s—would be called "The Pony Express" for several decades. It is now called "the Express."

Student life
There are over 50 student clubs and groups on campus, although there are no official fraternities or sororities. The campus does not offer any dorms.

Athletics
The Sacramento City College Panthers are members of the California Community College Athletic Association (CCCAA), and the Big 8 Conference. SCC fields 18 teams, including 10 women's teams and 8 men's teams. The baseball program has demonstrated the most consistent success with 37 league titles, 5 state titles, and 1 national title. On the women's side, the track and field team won 3 straight state titles (2003, 2004, 2005), while the softball program won 4 state titles between 1988 and 2004. Sac City's athletic alumni have competed in the Olympic Games, the World Series, the NFL playoffs, and a world championship boxing match. Several of its coaches (and former coaches) have coached or served in administrative positions on a national and international level, including the Olympic Games, the NFL, and Major League Baseball.

Alumni

American culture
 Michael James Adams – aviator and NASA astronaut
 Faith Bromberg – artist
 Herb Caen – former "items" columnist for the school newspaper went on to become a Pulitzer Prize-winning columnist for the San Francisco Chronicle
 Samuel Charters – writer on music and record producer
 Jessica Chastain – Academy Award-winning actress
 Nguyen Do – poet, editor and translator````
 Ray Eames – American artist, designer, architect and filmmaker
 Kurt Edward Fishback – photographer
 Sasha Grey – actress and adult film star
 Sherwood "Shakey" Johnson – founder of Shakey's Pizza Parlor chain
 Mel Ramos – artist
 Bergen Williams (1983-1984) - Filmmaker, inventor, artist, Donna Juana, strategist/script doctor/writer and actress (currently plays Big Alice on ABC'S General Hospital)
 Wes Wilson – rock poster artist

Athletes
 Malachi Davis – ran in the 400-meter and 4x400-meter at the 2004 Summer Olympics for the United Kingdom team
 Sheila Hudson – 1996 Olympian and former world record holder in the triple jump
 Tommy Kono – three-time medalist in weightlifting in the 1952 Summer Olympics, 1956 Summer Olympics and 1960 Summer Olympics
 Albert Miller – 3 time Olympian (1984, 1988, and 1992) in the decathlon for Fiji
 Tom Moore – world record holder in the 120 yard high hurdles in 1935, US national champion in the 400m hurdles in 1935, and member of the National Track & Field Hall of Fame
 Jamie Nieto – finished 4th in the high jump in the 2004 Summer Olympics
 Lou Nova – heavyweight boxer who was the 1935 amateur world champion, and fought Joe Louis in 1941
 Roger "Jack" Parker – bronze medalist in the decathlon at the 1936 Berlin Olympics
 Edwin Salisbury – was the stroke for the 1932 gold medal-winning men's rowing eights team that was later inducted into the National Rowing Foundation's Rowing Hall of Fame
 Richson Simeon - track and field athlete, competed at the 2016 Summer Olympics in the men’s 100 meters event for the Marshall Islands
 Scott Smith – professional mixed martial arts fighter in the UFC
 John "Jack" Stack – won a gold medal in the men's rowing eights at the 1948 Olympic Games
 George Stanich – bronze medalist in the high jump in the 1948 Summer Olympics, as well as John Wooden's first all-American basketball player at UCLA
 John Stanich – guard on the 1950 U.S. national basketball team which placed second at the 1950 FIBA World Championship, where he was the only American on the all-tournament team

Baseball alumni

 Facundo Cuno Barragan – former MLB catcher
 Dave Berg – seven-year MLB infielder
 Adam Bernero – former MLB pitcher
 Joe Bitker – former MLB pitcher
 Jeff Blauser – 13-year MLB shortstop with the Atlanta Braves and Chicago Cubs
 Chris Bosio – 10-year MLB pitcher with the Milwaukee Brewers and Seattle Mariners
 Larry Bowa – former MLB shortstop and current Los Angeles Dodgers third-base coach
 Jim Bowie – former MLB first baseman and current hitting coach for the Fresno Grizzlies
 Kevin Brown – former MLB pitcher
 Rob Cooper – College baseball coach at Wright State and Penn State
 Trace Coquillette – former MLB infielder
 Ken Dowell – former MLB shortstop
 Bob Forsch – former MLB pitcher
 Ken Forsch – former MLB pitcher
 La Vel Freeman – former MLB designated hitter
 Joe Horgan – former MLB pitcher
 Ken Hottman – former MLB outfielder
 John Spider Jorgensen – former MLB infielder
 Mike Marjama- catcher for the Seattle Mariners
 Jeffrey Marquez- pitcher for the Chicago White Sox
 Buck Martinez – 17-year MLB catcher
 Darrell May – former MLB pitcher
 Jason McDonald – former MLB outfielder
 John McNamara – former MLB manager
 Marcus Moore – former MLB pitcher
 David Moraga – former MLB pitcher
 Mike Neu former MLB pitcher and current Cal Berkeley head coach
 Jerry Nielsen – former MLB pitcher
 Geno Petralli – 12-year MLB catcher
 R. J. Reynolds – eight-year MLB outfielder
 Matt Riley – former MLB pitcher
 Rich Rodas – former MLB pitcher
 F. P. Santangelo – seven-year MLB player and an analyst on the San Francisco Giants pregame show on Fox Sports Net
 Rick Schu – former MLB infielder
 Joe Thurston – infielder in the St. Louis Cardinals organization
 Greg Vaughn – four-time MLB All-Star outfielder
 Randy Veres – former MLB pitcher
 Fernando Viña – 12-year infielder for five MLB teams
 Casey Weathers – member of the bronze medal winning 2008 Summer Olympics United States baseball team
 Larry Wolfe – former MLB infielder
 Charlie Zink – pitcher for the Boston Red Sox

Football alumni
 Robert Awalt – seven-year NFL tight end
 Issac Booth – three-year NFL defensive back
 James Campen - seven-year NFL offensive lineman for the Green Bay Packers, where he is currently an assistant coach.
 Gene Cronin – seven-year NFL defensive lineman
 Rick Cunningham – eight-year NFL lineman
 Bobby Dawson – former Canadian Football League defensive back
 Kenny Graham – seven-year AFL/NFL defensive back
 Akiem Hicks – current defensive lineman for the Chicago Bears of the NFL
 Mike Jones – three-year NFL tight end
 Stephen Jordan – former Canadian Football League defensive back who was the 1989 rookie of the year
 Derrick Lewis – former NFL and Arena Football League wide receiver
 Carl Littlefield – former NFL running back
 Stan Mataele – former NFL defensive lineman
 Perry Schwartz – all-American end for UC Berkeley's undefeated "Thunder Team" in 1937 and a first team all-NFL end for Brooklyn Dodgers in 1940 and 1941 when he led the league in yards per catch
 Phil Snow – football coach who is currently the defensive coordinator for Baylor University
 Alex Van Dyke – five-year NFL wide receiver, who also set NCAA receiving records while at the University of Nevada, Reno
 Seneca Wallace – former quarterback for the Cleveland Browns of the NFL
 Derek Ware – former NFL tight end and running back

Law and politics

 Jeff Adachi – elected Public Defender of San Francisco, pension reform advocate, and a former candidate for Mayor of San Francisco.
 Tani Cantil-Sakauye – 28th Chief Justice of California
 Morrison C. England, Jr. - Chief United States District Judge for the Eastern District of California.
 John E. Moss – served in 13 Congresses of the United States House of Representatives and championed the Freedom of Information Act

Notes

External links

 Official website

 
California Community Colleges
Universities and colleges in Sacramento County, California
Education in Sacramento, California
Schools accredited by the Western Association of Schools and Colleges
Educational institutions established in 1916
1916 establishments in California
Historic American Buildings Survey in California